Bacchides ( 2nd-century BCE) was a Syrian-Greek general and governor (strategos) and friend and advisor (philoi) of King Demetrius I Soter of the Seleucid Empire.  The Seleucid Empire was one of the Greek successor states (diadochi) founded after the conquests of Alexander the Great, and was centered in Syria and Babylonia in the Hellenistic era.

He is also called "ruler in the country beyond the river"—Euphrates.

Depiction in 1 Maccabees
The main source on Bacchides is the book 1 Maccabees.  The work was written in the Hasmonean kingdom after the success of the Maccabean Revolt against the Seleucid Empire, and is thus a source hostile to Bacchides.  Nevertheless, the book is open about the successes Bacchides achieved on behalf of the government.  According to it, Demetrius sent Bacchides in 161 BCE to Judea with a large army in order to invest Alcimus with the office of High Priest of Israel (I Macc. vii. 8, 9). This mission succeeded; the book of 1 Maccabees does not report any challenge to it, perhaps because the Maccabees were still rebuilding after their defeat at the Battle of Beth Zechariah. The peaceable Assideans credulously expected friendship from Alcimus; but, contrary to oath and covenant, he cruelly slew sixty of them (ib. vii. 16). Leaving Jerusalem, he made a slaughter-house of Bezeth (Bethzecha), and after handing the country over to Alcimus, returned to the king (ib. vii. 19, 20).

Demetrius sent Bacchides back to Judea. A Greek army, under General Nicanor, had been defeated by Judas Maccabeus (ib. vii. 26–50) at the Battle of Adasa. Nicanor had been killed near Adasa.  Bacchides was sent with Alcimus and an army of twenty thousand infantry and two thousand cavalry. Bacchides met Judas at The Battle of Elasa (Laisa). Judas was killed and his army defeated.

Bacchides now established the Hellenists as rulers in Judea; and the persecuted patriots (ib. ix. 25–27), under Jonathan, brother of Judas, fled beyond the Jordan River. Bacchides came upon them there on a Sabbath, and but suffered defeat, losing one thousand men (ib. ix. 43–49). He returned to Jerusalem, and, in order to subdue the Jews, fortified not only the Acra, but also Jericho, Emmaus, Beth-horon, Beth-el, Thamnata (Timnatha), Pharathon, Tephon, Beth-zur, and Gazara (ib. ix. 50–52). Soon after, Alcimus died, and Bacchides, having made a fruitless attack upon Jonathan, returned to the king. At the instigation of the Hellenists, he moved a third time against the Jews. Only after several struggles with Simon Thassi, brother of Judas and Jonathan, did he conclude an enforced treaty of peace with Jonathan, and depart into his own land (ib. ix. 58–73; Josephus, Ant. xii. 10, § 13; xiii. 1).

In other literature
In the book 2 Maccabees, a person named "Bacchides" is briefly mentioned as working with a Seleucid commander named "Timothy" (possibly Timothy of Ammon?).  Jonathan A. Goldstein writes that there is not enough evidence to tell if this is the same person mentioned in 1 Maccabees, while Robert Doran argues that they are probably not the same person.

The Jewish historian Josephus wrote of the Maccabees in both The Jewish War and Jewish Antiquities.  The representation of Bacchides in The Jewish War (B.J. i. 1, §§ 2, 3) as barbarous by nature, and the statement that he was slain by Mattathias, are both erroneous.  Antiquities seems to be largely based on 1 Maccabees, although it includes its own unique information at times brought from other sources.  

Bacchides acquired a number of variants of his name in other languages.  In the Syriac translation of 1 Maccabees, Bacchides, through an error in transcription, is called "Bicrius" instead of "Bacdius".  In Megillat Antiochus, a rabbinic Judaism version of the Hanukkah story written around the 2nd century CE, he is called Bagris, or Bogores.

References

Seleucid people in the books of the Maccabees
Seleucid generals
2nd-century BC people